Alfred Meyer (4 August 1882 – 9 January 1956) was a German writer. His work was part of the literature event in the art competition at the 1932 Summer Olympics.

References

1882 births
1956 deaths
20th-century German male writers
Olympic competitors in art competitions
People from Schwerin